Marinus Dijkhuizen (born 4 January 1972) is a Dutch professional football manager and former player who manages Excelsior. As a player, he had notable spells in his native Netherlands with Excelsior, SC Cambuur and TOP Oss. He retired in 2009 and entered management, eventually returning to Excelsior as manager in 2014.

Playing career
Dijkhuizen was born in 's-Gravenzande. A forward, he spent the majority of his 14-year professional career in the top two divisions of Dutch football, most notably with two spells at both Excelsior and SC Cambuur. He was a part of the SC Cambuur team which secured promotion to the Eredivisie in the 1997–98 season and later played top-flight football with FC Utrecht. He had a loan spell with Scottish Premier League club Dunfermline Athletic during the 2000–01 season. He retired at the end of the 2008–09 season after a player-coach spell at hometown club 's-Gravenzande SC.

Coaching career

's-Gravenzandse SV 
In 2008, Dijkhuizen took up a coaching role at Eerste Klasse club 's-Gravenzandse SV, the club where he began his career. He left the club in 2009.

FC Utrecht 
During the 2012–13 Eredivisie season, Dijkhuizen worked as a forward coach at former club FC Utrecht. In January 2018, he returned to the club as assistant to manager Jean-Paul de Jong and remained in the role until January 2020.

Managerial career

VV Montfoort 
Dijkhuizen began his managerial career with Eerste Klasse Saturday club VV Montfoort in 2009. He led the club to two successive promotions in the 2009–10 and 2010–11 seasons, taking the club to the Topklasse. He departed at the end of the 2011–12 season.

VV De Meern 
Dijkhuizen signed a two-year contract with Derde Klasse Sunday club VV De Meern in January 2012. After officially starting work on 1 July 2012, he managed the club until December 2013.

Excelsior
On 1 January 2014, Dijkhuizen was announced as manager of Eerste Divisie club Excelsior on a contract running until the end of the 2013–14 season. He took over from Jon Dahl Tomasson, who had departed for Eredivisie club Roda JC Kerkrade. Starting out in seventh position in the table, Dijkhuizen encouraged the club to be more attacking and pushed striker Lars Veldwijk further forward. Veldwijk's 17 goals since the Dijkhuizen's arrival helped fire the Kralingers to third-place in the table and promotion to the Eredivisie, after a 4–2 aggregate victory over RKC Waalwijk in the playoffs. The club endured a difficult 2014–15 season in the top-flight, finishing one place above the relegation zone, though a new defensive style contributed to 14 draws, the most in the division. Dijkhuizen departed the club in May 2015, despite having signed a new two-year contract in December 2014.

Brentford
On 1 June 2015, Dijkhuizen was announced as head coach of English Championship club Brentford, replacing Mark Warburton. He installed former SC Cambuur teammate Roy Hendriksen as his assistant. Dijkhuizen had a difficult first week of the 2015–16 season and began the campaign with a crippling lack of players through injury and outgoing transfers, which caused disharmony amongst the club's supporters. Problems with a poor pitch at Griffin Park compounded the injury problems. After two wins, two draws and five defeats from the first 9 matches of the season, Dijkhuizen and Hendriksen parted company with Brentford on 28 September 2015. Brentford co-director of football Rasmus Ankersen later revealed that the club "made a mistake" in hiring Dijkhuizen and that the decision to part company "was based on three months of training and there were some fundamental processes, in terms of getting a full football operation to work to its maximum, that weren't at the level we wanted them to be".

NAC Breda 
On 26 October 2015, Dijkhuizen was announced as head coach of Eerste Divisie club NAC Breda. He guided the club to the third round of the promotion/relegation playoffs, but lost over two legs to the promoted club Willem II. With the club struggling to compete after 18 matches of the 2016–17 season, Dijkhuizen was sacked on 23 December 2016.

SC Cambuur 
On 9 May 2017, Dijkhuizen returned to Eerste Divisie club SC Cambuur and took up the position of head coach on a one-year contract. He was sacked on 28 November 2017, after taking just 14 points from the opening 15 matches of the 2017–18 season.

Return to Excelsior 
On 29 January 2020, Dijkhuizen returned to Eerste Divisie club Excelsior on a -year contract. Following the COVID-19-affected 2019–20 season and a finish outside the playoffs in 2020–21, Dijkhuizen secured promotion with victory over ADO Den Haag in the 2021–22 Eredivisie promotion/relegation playoff Final. He signed a new one-year contract in April 2022.

Other work 
From 2008 to 2012, Dijkhuizen worked as an analyst for Excelsior, researching and providing data on the club's upcoming opponents.

Personal life 
Dijkhuizen's brother Marc is also involved in football and the pair worked together on the coaching staff at 's-Gravenzandse SV during the 2008–09 season.

Career statistics

Honours

As a player 
SC Cambuur
 Eerste Divisie play-offs: 1997–98

Excelsior
 Eerste Divisie: 2005–06

As a manager 
VV Montfoort
 Hoofdklasse third-place promotion: 2010–11
 Eerste Klasse third-place promotion: 2009–10
Excelsior
 Eerste Divisie play-offs: 2013–14
 Eredivisie promotion/relegation play-offs: 2021–22

References

External links
 

1972 births
Living people
People from 's-Gravenzande
Association football forwards
Dutch footballers
Excelsior Maassluis players
Excelsior Rotterdam players
SC Cambuur players
FC Utrecht players
Dunfermline Athletic F.C. players
FC Emmen players
TOP Oss players
Eredivisie players
Eerste Divisie players
Dutch expatriate footballers
Expatriate footballers in Scotland
Dutch expatriate sportspeople in Scotland
Scottish Premier League players
Dutch football managers
Eredivisie managers
Eerste Divisie managers
Excelsior Rotterdam managers
Brentford F.C. managers
NAC Breda managers
SC Cambuur managers
Dutch expatriate football managers
Expatriate football managers in England
Dutch expatriate sportspeople in England
English Football League managers
Footballers from South Holland